This page provides links to detailed lists of moth species that have been recorded in Chile. The lists are sorted by family.

List of moths of Chile (Gracillariidae)
List of moths of Chile (Tortricidae)
List of moths of Chile (Cossidae)
List of moths of Chile (Lasiocampidae)
List of moths of Chile (Saturniidae)
List of moths of Chile (Noctuidae)

See also
List of butterflies of Chile
Wildlife of Chile

References
Armas Hill Focus on Nature Tours.com: A List of Chilean Butterflies and Moths 

 01
Chile
Moths

Chile